The Avenue U station is a local station on the BMT Sea Beach Line of the New York City Subway, located at the intersection of Avenue U and West Seventh Street in Gravesend, Brooklyn. It is served by the N train at all times. During rush hours, several W and northbound Q trains also serve the station.

History 

This station opened on June 22, 1915, along with the rest of the Sea Beach Line.

In 2005, the station was listed on the National Register of Historic Places.

From January 18, 2016 to May 22, 2017, the Manhattan-bound platform at this station was closed for renovations. The Coney Island-bound platform was closed for a longer period of time, from July 31, 2017 to October 29, 2018.

Station layout

This station has four tracks and two side platforms. The two center express tracks are not normally used, but both are available for rerouted trains. The platforms are in an open cut. The concrete walls and columns are painted beige (prior to renovations the columns were blue-green). Alternating columns display the standard black station name plate with white lettering.

The 2018 artwork at this station is "Edges of a South Brooklyn Sky", a series of 14 glass mosaics made by Sally Gil. The artwork represent the local community of Gravesend and the diversity of its residents.

Exits
This station has two entrances, both of which are beige station houses at street-level between West Seventh and West Eighth Streets above the tracks and have a single staircase leading to each platform at either ends. The main exit at the south end has a turnstile bank and token booth and leads to Avenue U while the exit at the north end leads to Avenue T and is un-staffed, containing just HEET turnstiles and exit-only turnstiles.

Notes

References

External links 
 
 Station Reporter — N Train
 The Subway Nut — Avenue U Pictures
 Avenue U entrance from Google Maps Street View
 Avenue T entrance from Google Maps Street View
Uptown Platform from Google Maps Street View

U
Railway and subway stations on the National Register of Historic Places in New York City
New York City Subway stations in Brooklyn
Railway stations in the United States opened in 1915
1915 establishments in New York City
National Register of Historic Places in Brooklyn